Toller may refer to:

Places:
 Toller, a ward in the City of Bradford metropolitan district of West Yorkshire, England.
 River Toller, an old name for the River Hooke in Dorset, England
 Places in Dorset named after the river:
 Toller Fratrum, a village and civil parish
 Toller Porcorum, a village and civil parish
 Toller Whelme, a hamlet
 Toller railway station (1862–1975), a former railway station in Toller Porcorum

People:
 Ernst Toller (1893–1939), German playwright, briefly President of the short-lived Bavarian Soviet Republic in 1919
 Karen Toller (1662–1742), wealthy Norwegian estate owner and ship owner
 Montagu Toller (1871–1948), English cricketer
 Niels Toller (1592–1642), wealthiest person in, and mayor of, Christiania (Oslo), Norway
 Paula Toller (born 1962), Brazilian singer
 Samuel Toller (1764–1821), English advocate-general of Madras and legal writer
 Thomas Northcote Toller (1844–1930), British academic and one of the editors of An Anglo-Saxon Dictionary
 Toller Cranston (1949–2015), Canadian figure skater

Other uses:
 Nova Scotia Duck Tolling Retriever, a breed of Canadian gun dog

See also
 "Tollers", a nickname for author J. R. R. Tolkien